Dodonaea filifolia, commonly known as thread-leaved hop-bush, is a species of shrub endemic to New South Wales, Queensland, South Australia, Western Australia, and the Northern Territory. Its fruit is red, suffused with yellow, and grows from September to December.

References

filifolia
Endemic flora of Australia
Rosids of Western Australia
Sapindales of Australia